= Old Petra Museum =

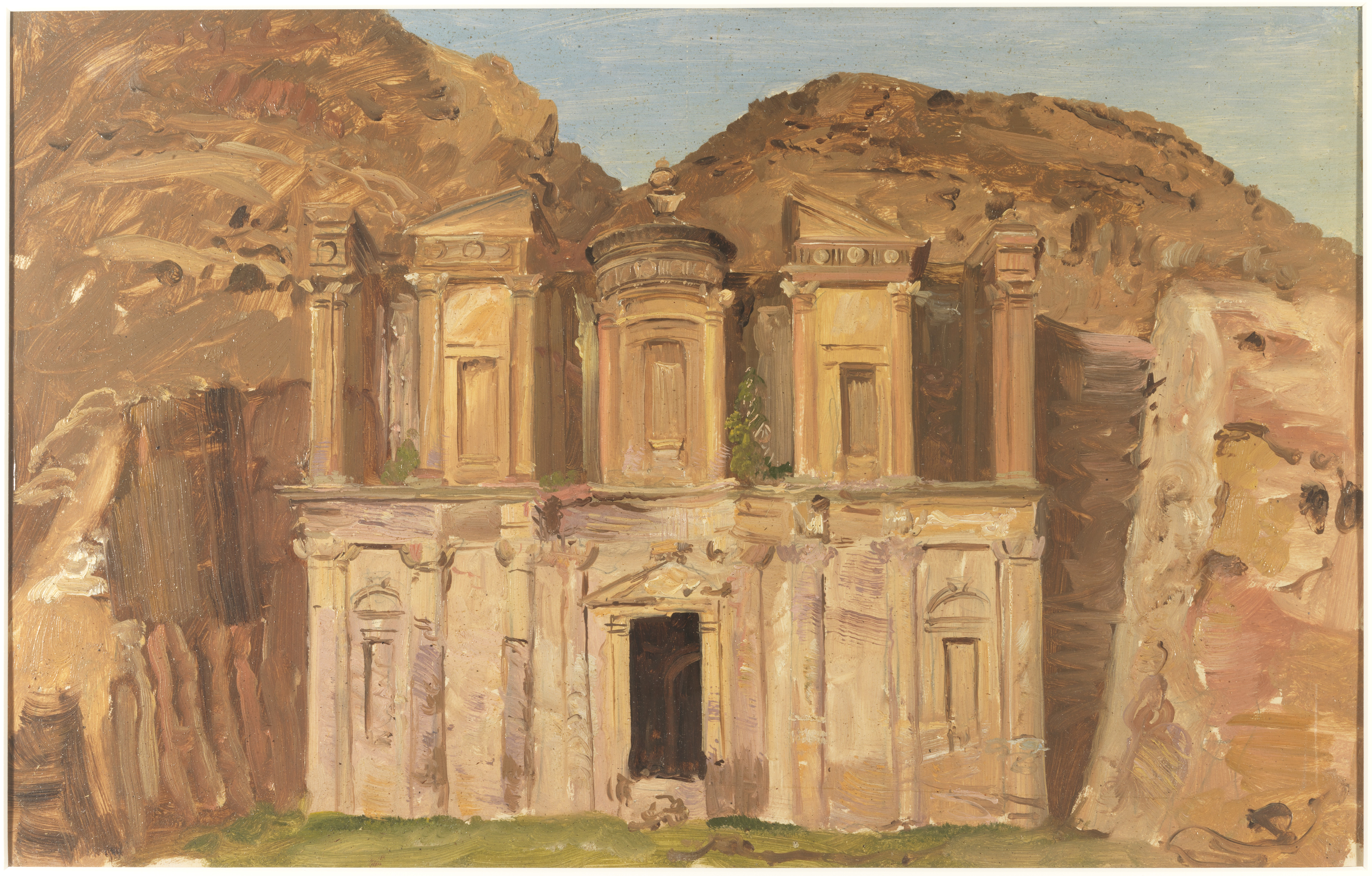
- Established: 1963; 63 years ago
- Location: Petra, Jordan
- Coordinates: 30.324600°N 35.467970°E
- Type: Cultural museum

The Old Petra Museum is one of the archaeological museums in the city of Petra, Jordan. It is located inside the natural rock within one of the Nabataean caves in Petra.

== Establishing ==
The ancient museum is located inside the natural rock, within one of the Nabatean caves, leading to Al Habees Castle in Petra, and was established in 1963. It consists of a main hall and two side rooms. Visitors climb up to the museum.

== Museum treasures ==
Inside, it contains seven showcases, which contain a group of archaeological assets Nabataean, Roman and Byzantine periods, discovered in the city of Petra by foreign missions and excavations carried out by the Department of Antiquities. This museum is dedicated to the display of architectural ornaments and stone sculptures. The Department of Antiquities is currently reorganizing the exhibits of this museum after the opening of the Petra Nabatean Museum.

== The new Museum ==
General View of Petra new museum

Upon an agreement signed between the Jordanian authorities and a Japanese on 1 March 2014, a new modern site of Petra museum was built. It took five years and more than seven million dollars to build the new 1800 m^{2} site.

== Gallery ==
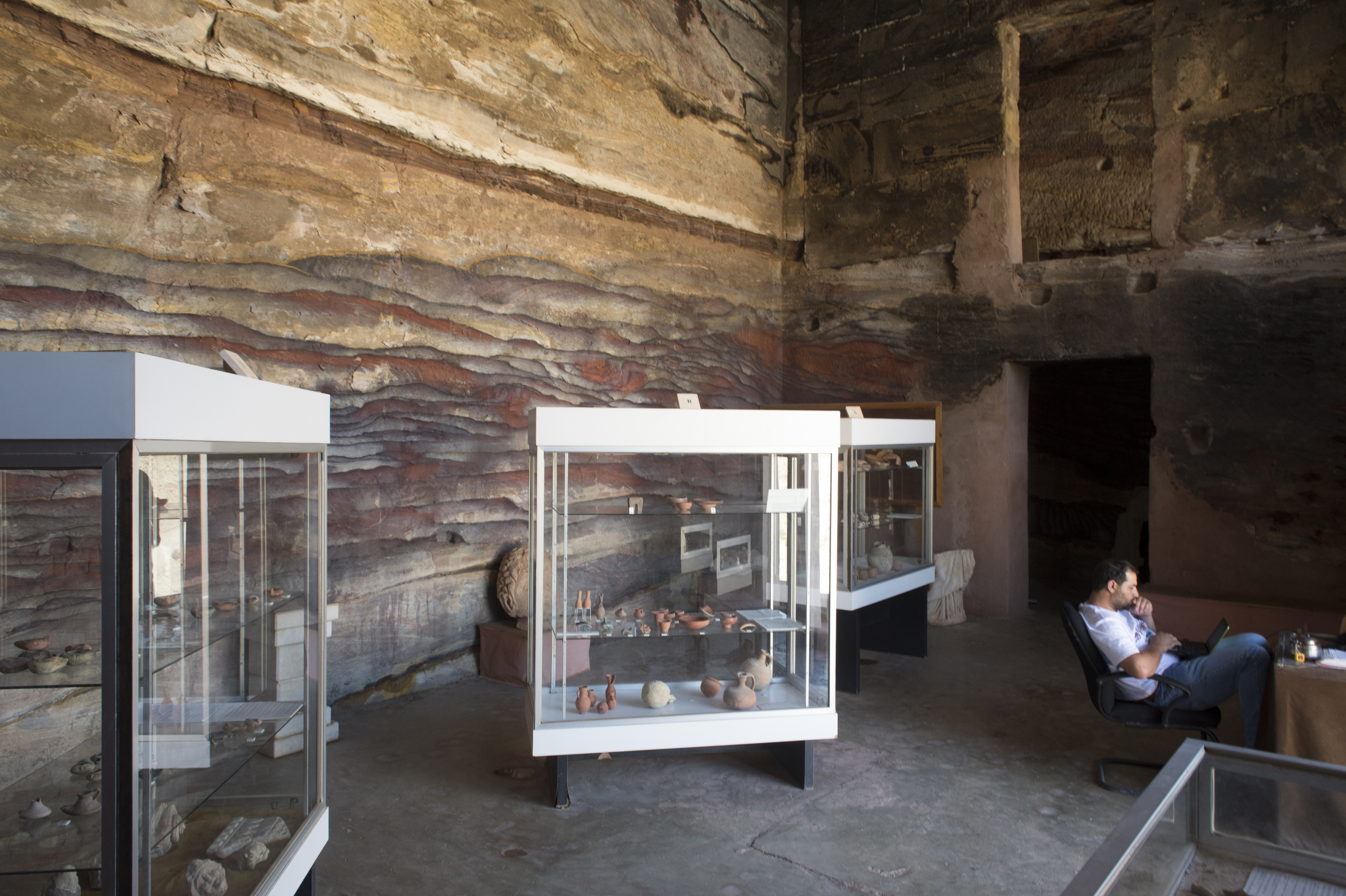

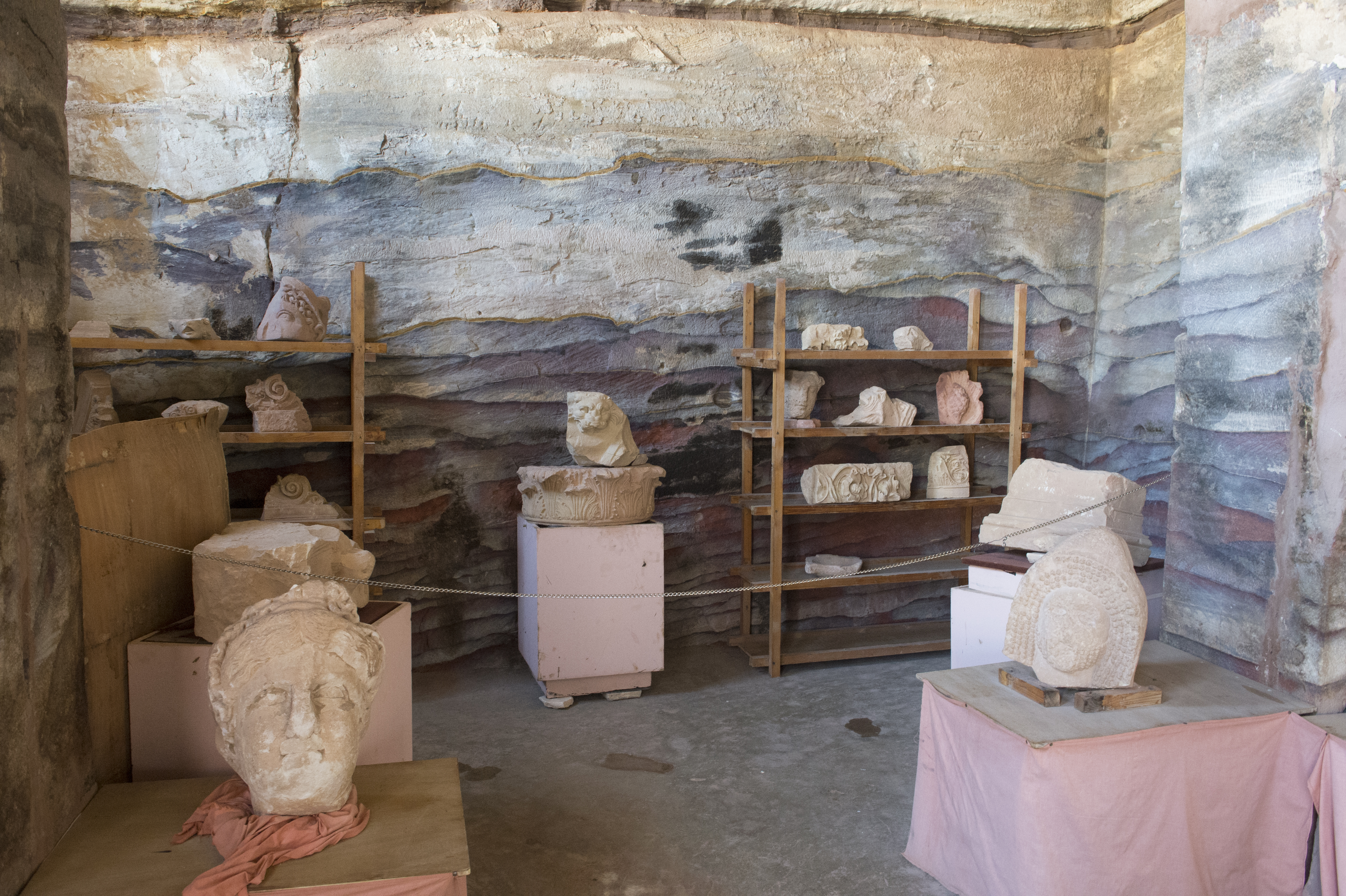

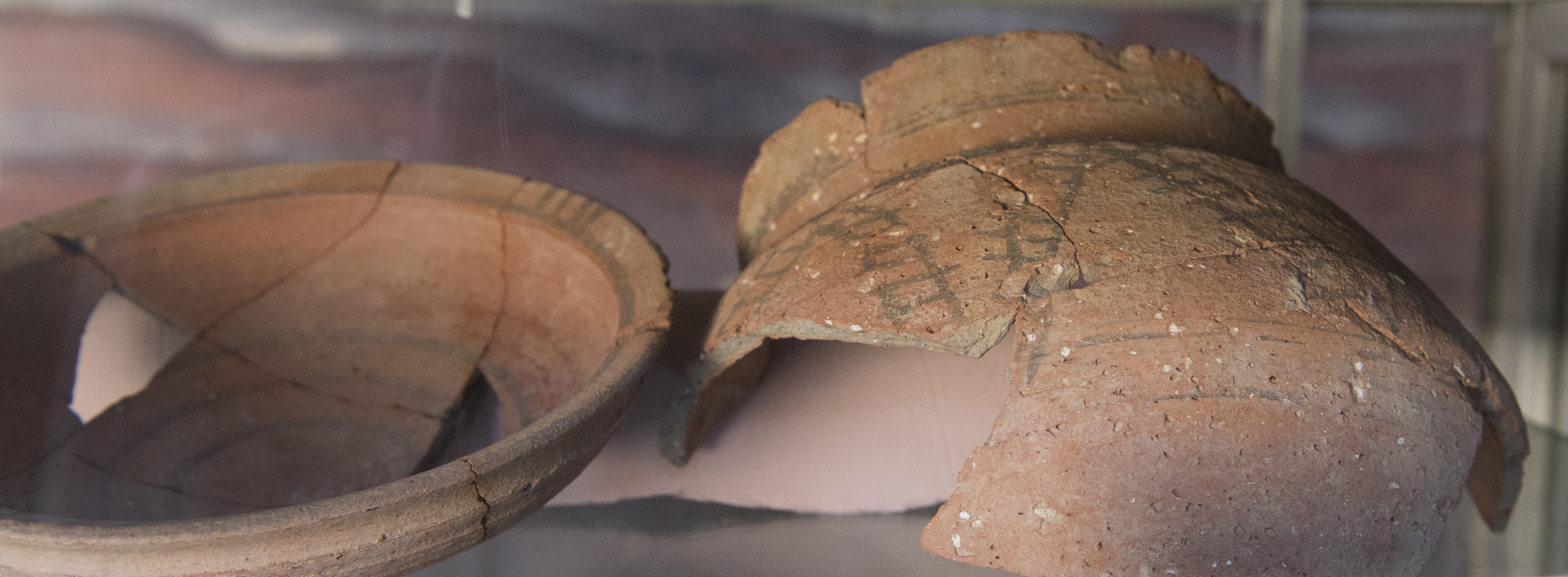

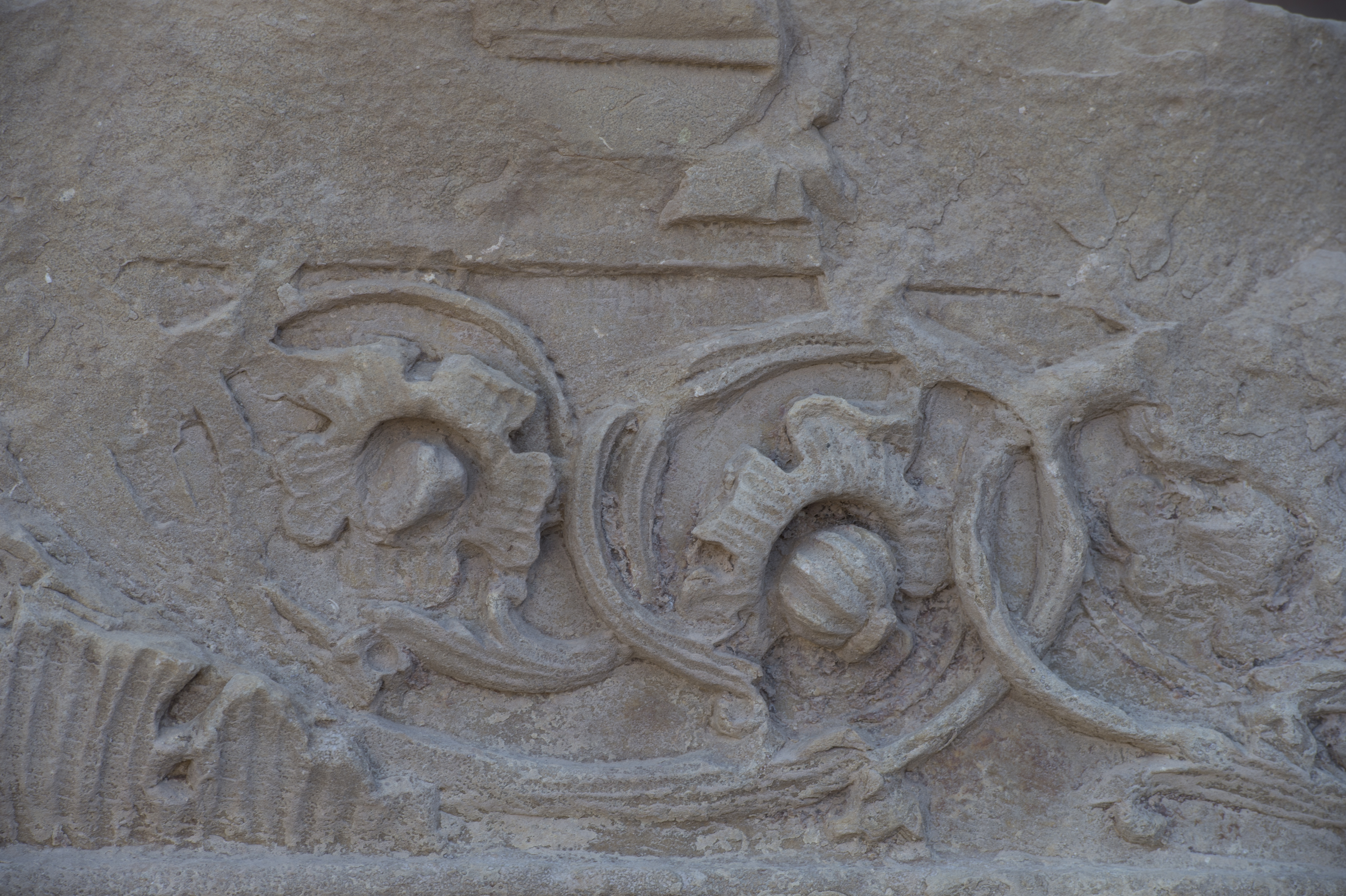

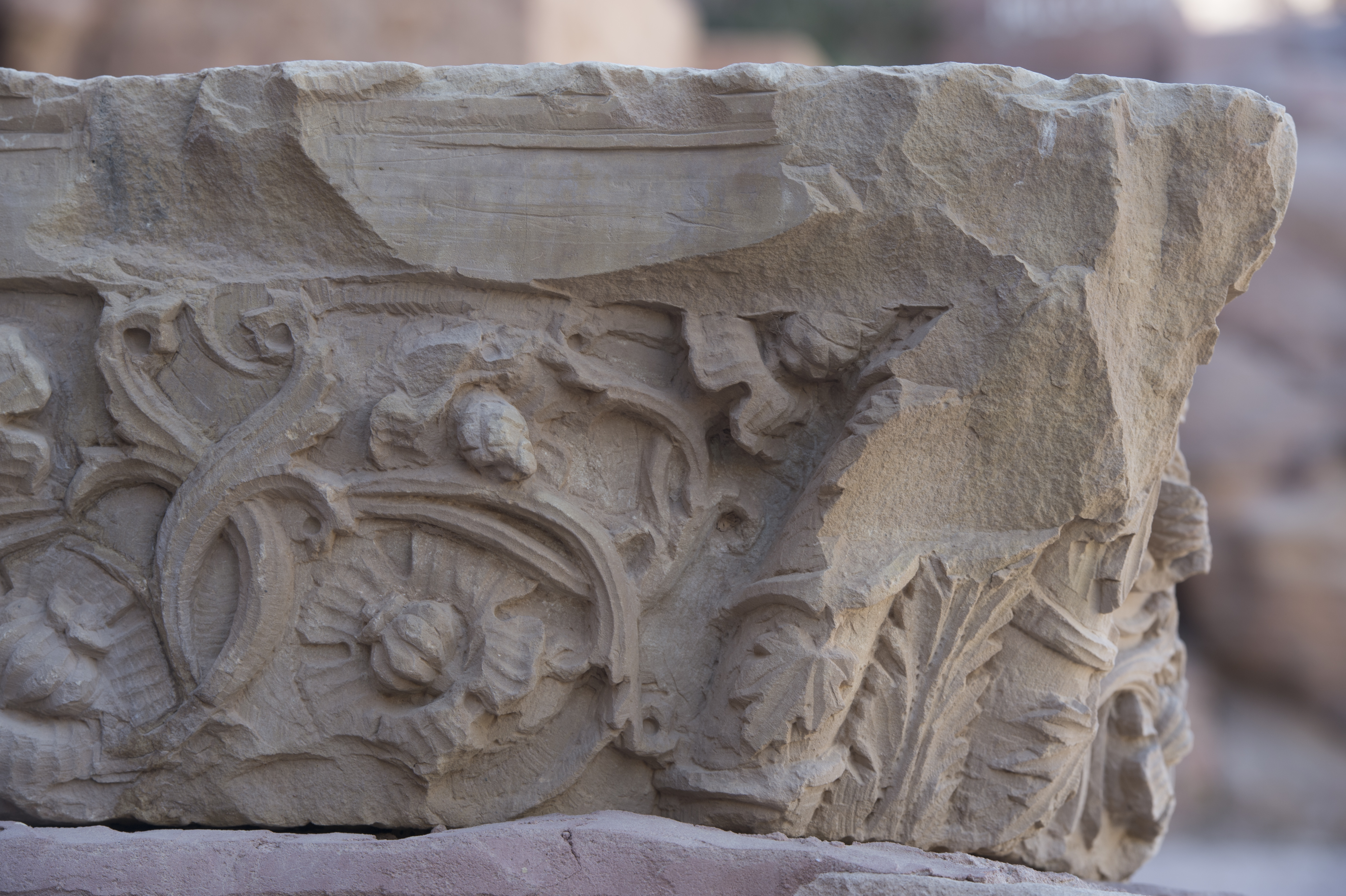

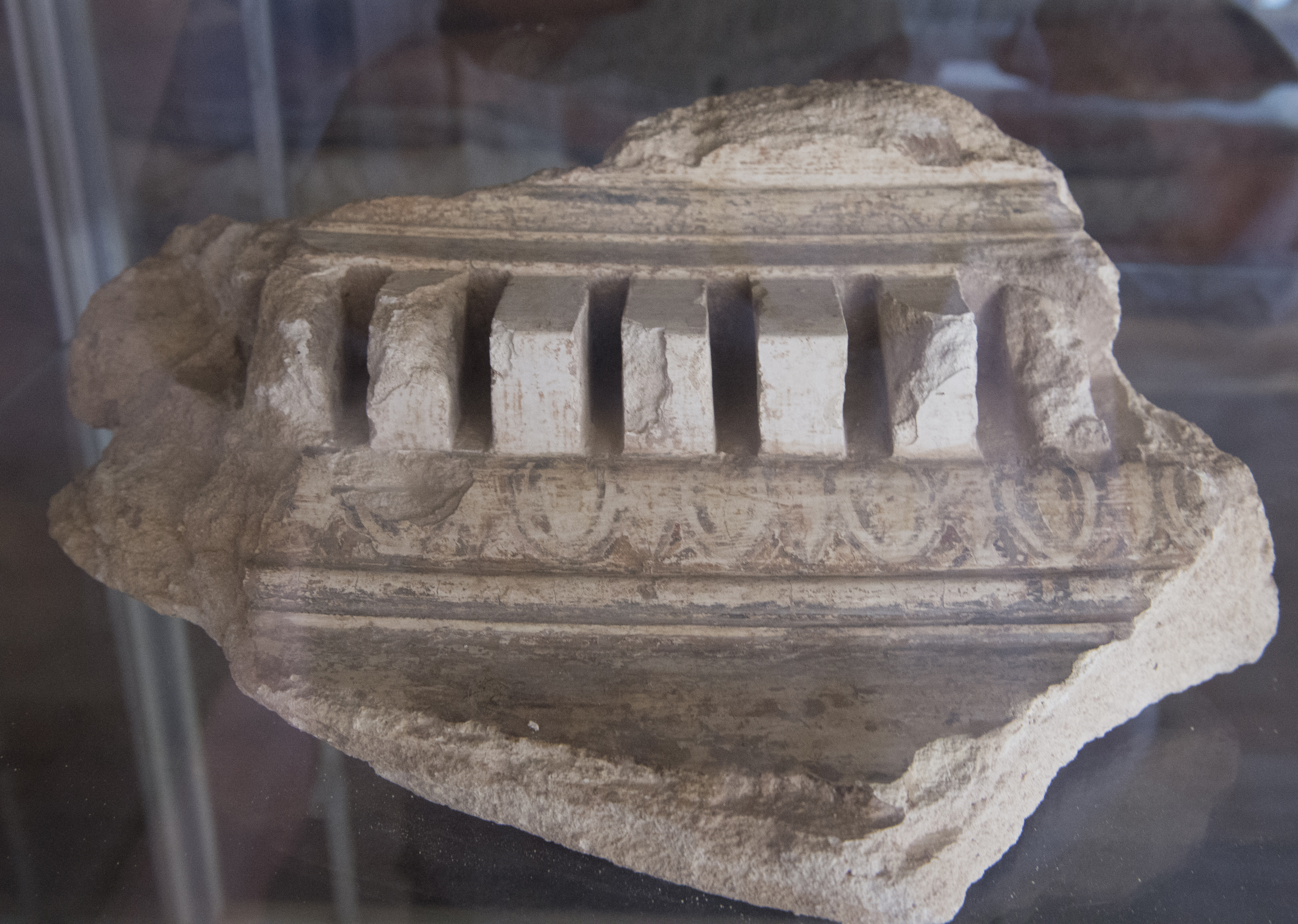
